Frank Harris (born March 27, 1999) is an American football quarterback for the UTSA Roadrunners.

College career
As a true freshman in 2017, Harris redshirted and did not play.

In 2018, Harris missed the season due to knee injuries.

As a redshirt-sophomore in 2019, Harris started four games before separating his shoulder and missing the rest of the year.

During his redshirt-junior year, Harris started 11 games, completing 159-of-250 passes for 1,630 yards and 12 touchdowns, along with six interceptions. He additionally ran for 528 yards and scored nine touchdowns. He led them to a berth in the 2020 First Responder Bowl, where they lost to Louisiana 31–24.

In 2021, Harris started 14 games, and completed 263-of-398 passes for 3,177 yards and 27 touchdowns with six interceptions. He ran for 566 yards as well and scored six touchdowns. Harris led UTSA to the conference championship, where he was 19-of-28 for 218 yards and two scores, while adding 81 yards on the ground as UTSA beat Western Kenucky 49–41. The Roadrunners lost in the 2021 Frisco Bowl to San Diego State. At the end of the season, Harris was named second-team all-conference.

In the 2022 season, Harris started 14 games and completed 328-of-471 pass attempts for 4,063 yards and 32 touchdowns. He also ran for 602 yards and nine scores, being named the Conference USA most valuable player and first-team all-conference. Harris led the team to the 2022 Conference USA Football Championship Game, where UTSA defeated North Texas by a score of 48–27. In the game, he threw for 341 yards and four touchdowns while completing all but five of his 37 pass attempts. UTSA was defeated in the 2022 Cure Bowl by Troy, losing 18–12.

After the season, Harris announced he would return to UTSA for a seventh year in 2023.

Statistics

References

1999 births
Living people
American football quarterbacks
UTSA Roadrunners football players